Edward Stutterheim (11 August 1908, Amsterdam - 13 April 1977, Opio) was a sailor from the Netherlands, who represented his country as  at the 1948 Summer Olympics in Torbay. Stutterheim, as crew member on the Dutch Star BEM II, took the bronze medal with helmsman Bob Maas. The team returned in 1952 in Helsinki where they took the 7th place.

In the 1956 Olympics in Melbourne Stutterheim was the Dragon crew for the Dutch Olympic team. However, after the Soviet invasion of Hungary, the Dutch government decided that the Dutch Olympic team would not compete.

Sources

External links

1908 births
1977 deaths
Sportspeople from Amsterdam
Dutch male sailors (sport)

Sailors at the 1948 Summer Olympics – Star
Sailors at the 1952 Summer Olympics – Star
Olympic sailors of the Netherlands
Medalists at the 1948 Summer Olympics
Olympic medalists in sailing
Olympic bronze medalists for the Netherlands
20th-century Dutch people